The Red Flag 7-class  ( Pulg'ŭn'gi-7), also known as the Red Flag 2.16 class (붉은기2.16 Pulg'ŭn'gi-2.16) is a two-section, permanently coupled electric locomotive built by the Kim Chong-t'ae Electric Locomotive Works in North Korea and used by the Korean State Railway for heavy freight trains on mountainous lines.

Description

Following the success of the Red Flag 6-class articulated locomotives, the Kim Chong-t'ae Electric Locomotive Works set to the development of a successor in the early 1990s. They are essentially an upgraded, two-part version of the Ch'ŏngnyŏnjŏl Kinyom-class locomotives, which are a locally manufactured derivative of the Francorail-MTE CSE26-21-type diesel locomotives received by the Korean State Railway from France in the 1980s.

The first two prototypes were numbered 7001 and 7002, and both were painted in different variations of a red and yellow livery. Misleadingly, 7001 wore "Red Flag 6" nameplates on the cab ends; 7002, however, carried new nameplates inscribed with the new designation, Red Flag 2.16 class, after the birthdate of Kim Jong-il.

Aside from the two prototypes, locomotives of this class have not yet been noted on rail lines generally seen by foreigners, though two have been seen inside the Kim Chong-t'ae Works plant. 7002 was on display at the Museum of the Three Revolutions in P'yŏngyang for a time, but by the spring of 2007 it had been removed and put into service in the northern part of the country.

References

Standard gauge locomotives of North Korea
Kim Chong-tae Works locomotives
3000 V DC locomotives
Bo′Bo′+Bo′Bo′ locomotives